Charles Henry Purday (11 January 1799 – 1885) was a Scottish composer of music for hymns.

Purday was a precentor of the Church of Scotland, and was chosen to sing at the Coronation of Queen Victoria.

He was active in supporting strong copyright protection for composers and publishers; he was a foundation member of the Music Publishers Association.

Compositions

Sacred
He wrote several hymn tunes for organ, which have been given the names:
"Bayswater"
"Gainsworth"
"St Michael's"
"Notting Hill"
"Sandon", his most popular tune, familiar as "Lead, Kindly Light"
"St Ulrich"

Profane
"The Old English Gentleman"

Publications
Purday, C, H. (ed.), Songs for the young, sacred and moral (1851)
Purday, C. H., Crown Court Psalmody (1854)
Purday, C. H., Church and Home Metrical Psalter and Hymnal (1860) 
Purday, C. H. and Havergal, Francis, Songs of Peace and Joy (1879)

References 

1799 births
1885 deaths
Scottish composers
British hymnwriters
Scottish hymnwriters
Christian hymnwriters
19th-century hymnwriters